Joseph Anim-Danso is a Ghanaian politician and was a member of the first parliament of the second Republic of Ghana. He represented the Kwame Danso constituency under the membership of the Progress Party.

Early life and education 
Joseph was born on 30 October 1933 in the Bono East Region of Ghana. He attended  Cape Coast school of Administration where he obtained his Elementary and Higher Local Government certificate. He then moved to Accra to advance his education at the University of Ghana, Legon.

Politics 
Joseph began his political career in 1969 when he became the parliamentary candidate for the Progress Party (PP)  to represent  Kwame-Danso constituency prior to the commencement of the 1969 Ghanaian parliamentary election. He assumed office as a member of the first parliament of the second Republic of Ghana on 1 October 1969 after being pronounced winner at the 1969 Ghanaian parliamentary election. His tenure ended on 13 January 1972.

Personal life 
He is a Christian.

References 

1933 births
Living people
People from Bono East Region
Ghanaian Christians
Progress Party (Ghana) politicians
Ghanaian MPs 1969–1972
University of Ghana alumni